Cut Off (historically named La Coupe) is a census-designated place (CDP) on the Bayou Lafourche in Lafourche Parish, Louisiana, United States. The population was 5,533 in 2020. It is part of the Houma–Bayou Cane–Thibodaux metropolitan statistical area. Cut Off's ZIP code is 70345, the area code is 985 and local telephone prefixes are 325, 632 and 693.

History
Cut Off had its start by the building of a canal cutoff at that point from Bayou Lafourche northeast to Lake Salvador, to shorten the route to New Orleans. The name (La Coupe, or "The Cut") was French in origin.

Geography
Cut Off is located in south-central Lafourche Parish at  (29.515201, -90.333839), on both sides of Bayou Lafourche. It is bordered to the northwest by Larose and to the south by Galliano.

Louisiana Highway 1 runs through the center of Cut Off, along the west bank of Bayou Lafourche, while Highway 308 runs along the east bank. Highway 3235, a four-lane highway, runs through the west side of the community. All three highways lead northwest into Larose and south into Galliano.

Demographics

As of the 2020 United States census, there were 5,533 people, 2,375 households, and 1,711 families residing in the CDP.

Notable people 

 Joe Barry, swamp pop singer; born and died in Cut Off
 Vin Bruce, Cajun vocalist
 Trishelle Cannatella, reality television personality
 Dick Guidry, former state representative from Lafourche Parish and owner of the disbanded Jet Drive-in Theater, a local landmark in Cut Off
 Bobby Hebert, former New Orleans Saints and Atlanta Falcons quarterback
 Rita Benson LeBlanc, part-owner and former heir apparent of the New Orleans Saints
 Jimmie Noone, jazz clarinet great
 Glen Pitre, writer and film director
 Loulan Pitre, Jr., lawyer and former state representative for Lafourche Parish, brother of Glen Pitre

Government and infrastructure
The United States Postal Service operates the Cut Off Post Office.

Culture
A particular section of the town is known as Côte Blanche, French for "White Coast" because of a statistically abnormal number of white painted homes that lined Bayou Lafourche for much of the early and mid 1900s.
In a segment of Dirty Jobs, Mike Rowe interviewed a Cut Off alligator farmer.

Education
Lafourche Parish Public Schools operates public schools.
 Cut Off Elementary School

Larose-Cut Off Middle School is in nearby Larose, and serves Cut Off CDP.

South Lafourche High School is in Galliano, and has a Cut Off postal address. It also serves Cut Off.

Cut Off School opened in 1927. In September 1950 the schools of Larose and Cut Off were consolidated into Larose-Cut Off High School. It was then consolidated with Golden Meadow High School to form South Lafourche High School in 1966.

Lafourche Parish Library operates the South Lafourche Library in Galliano, which has a Cut Off postal address.

References

External links
 Larose-Cut Off Middle School
 Cut Off Elementary School

Census-designated places in Lafourche Parish, Louisiana
Census-designated places in Louisiana
Census-designated places in Houma – Thibodaux metropolitan area